Raoul Samuel Gunsbourg (born January 6, 1860 in Bucharest - died May 31, 1955 in Monte Carlo) was a Jewish-Romania-born opera director, impresario, composer and writer. Gunsbourg is best known for being the longest-serving director of the Opéra de Monte-Carlo, where his career spanned almost six decades.

Raoul Gunsbourg acquired his musical education and its comprehensive knowledge in language and literature as a self-taught person. He attended Medical School in Bucharest which he finished in 1875. In 1877-78 he served as a medic in the Russian army during the Russian-Turkish war. In 1881-83 he created and managed the Gunsbourg's French Opera Stage in Moscow and St. Petersburg. In Moscow Gunsbourg met German composer Richard Wagner. After returning to France, Gunsbourg directed the Grand Théâtre de Lille during the 1888/89 season and the Opéra de Nice in 1889-91.

In 1892, on recommendation by czar Alexander III of Russia, Gunsbourg was invited by Princess Alice, an American wife of Albert I, Prince of Monaco, to serve as the director of the Opéra de Monte-Carlo. Empowered by Princess Alice's encouragement and support, Gunsbourg transformed the Opéra de Monte-Carlo into a world-class cultural venue. He was the first opera director to stage Berlioz's La damnation de Faust, which was considered at that time so far more as an oratorio than opera, in his theatre on February 18, 1893.

Gunsbourg's work in Monte Carlo was briefly interrupted during World War II. Assisted by members of the French Resistance, Gunsbourg fled to nearby Switzerland, escaping arrest and possible execution by the Nazis who occupied Monaco in 1943 and began the deportation of the Jewish population. After the war was over, Gunsbourg returned to Monaco where he continued directing the Opéra de Monte-Carlo until 1951.

Stage works (operas)
Le Vieil Aigle (The Old Eagle), 1 act (premiered February 13, 1909 in Monte Carlo) 
Ivan le Terrible, 3 acts (October 20, 1910 in Brussels, Théâtre de la Monnaie) 
Venise, 3 acts (March 8, 1913 in Monte Carlo) 
Maître Manole, 3 acts (March 17, 1918 in Monte Carlo) 
Satan, 9 tableaux (March 20, 1920 in Monte Carlo) 
Lysistrata, 3 acts (February 20, 1923 in Monte Carlo) 
Les Dames galantes de Brantome, 5 scenes (together with M. Thiriet and H. Tomasi) (February 12, 1946 in Monte Carlo)

See also
Gonsbourg, Raoul (1860-1955)
Raoul Gonsbourg
Kobbe's Complete Opera Book on Gunsbourg
Zwischen Petersburg und Monte Carlo by Raoul Gunsbourg

References

Romanian classical composers
Romanian writers
Romanian Jews
Musicians from Bucharest
Opera managers
1860 births
1955 deaths
Jewish opera composers
Male classical composers
Male opera composers